Machete Maidens Unleashed! is a 2010 Australian documentary film directed by Mark Hartley.

Synopsis
The documentary explores exploitation films made in the Philippines in the 1970s and 1980s with interviews for the documentary include Allan Arkush, Judy Brown, Colleen Camp, Roger Corman, Joe Dante, Pam Grier, Jack Hill, John Landis, Danny Peary, Eddie Romero, Cirio H. Santiago, and Brian Trenchard-Smith.

Interviewees
The actors, directors, screenwriters and producers interviewed for the film were:

Carmen Argenziano
Allan Arkush
Alan Birkinshaw
Judith Brown
Andrea Cagan
Colleen Camp
Steve Carver
Leigh Christian
Marlene Clark
Roger Corman
Joe Dante
Jon Davison
Marissa Delgado
Nick Deocampo
R. Lee Ermey
Leo Fong
Eddie Garcia
Pam Grier
Franco Guerrero
Sid Haig
Gloria Hendry
Jack Hill
Darby Hinton
Mark Holcomb
Lenore Kasdorf
Rosanne Katon
Jayne Kennedy
Leon Isaac Kennedy
Paul Koslo
John Landis
Marrie Lee
Margaret Markov
Jan Merlin
Dick Miller
Christopher Mitchum
Eddie Nicart
Trina Parks
Danny Peary
Efren C. Piñon
Barbara Pokras
Corliss Randall
Susanne Reed
Ricardo Remias
Eddie Romero
Fred Roos
Laurie Rose
Digna Santiago
Jane Schaffer
Samuel M. Sherman
Dean Tavoularis
Pete Tombs
Brian Trenchard-Smith
Joe Viola
Patrick Wayne
Celeste Yarnall
Joseph Zucchero

Reception 
This movie was met with critical acclaim as it has an 88% rating on Rotten Tomatoes.

Films referenced
This is a list of the films that are commented on or analyzed in the voiceover or by the interviewees. The list is in chronological order. The main films referenced in the documentary are:

Terror Is a Man (1959)
Brides of Blood (1968)
The Mad Doctor of Blood Island (1969)
Beast of Blood (1970)
The Losers (1970)
Beast of the Yellow Night (1971)
The Big Doll House (1971)
Women in Cages (1971)
Night of the Cobra Woman (1972)
The Big Bird Cage (1972)
The Hot Box (1972)
The Twilight People (1972)
The Woman Hunt (1972)
Beyond Atlantis (1973)
Black Mama White Mama (1973)
Fly Me (1973)
Savage! (1973)
Savage Sisters (1974)
Cover Girl Models (1975)
T.N.T. Jackson (1975)
Ebony, Ivory & Jade (1976)
Hollywood Boulevard (1976)
The Muthers (1976)
They Call Her Cleopatra Wong (1978)
Vampire Hookers (1978)
Apocalypse Now (1979)
Dynamite Johnson (1979)
Up from the Depths (1979)
Firecracker (1981)
For Your Height Only (1981)
The One-Armed Executioner (1981)
The Impossible Kid (1982)
Invaders of the Lost Gold (1982)
The Siege of Firebase Gloria (1989)

See also
The Search for Weng Weng
Not Quite Hollywood: The Wild, Untold Story of Ozploitation!
B movie
List of Filipino films

External links

Official trailer

References

2010 films
Documentary films about the film industry
Australian documentary films
Films directed by Mark Hartley
2010s exploitation films
2010s English-language films